Turbo heisei is a species of sea snail, a marine gastropod mollusk in the family Turbinidae, the turban snails.

Taxonomic status: Some authors place the name in the subgenus Turbo (Taeniaturbo)

Distribution
This species occurs in the Atlantic Ocean off Brazil.

Description 
The maximum recorded shell length is 25 mm.

Habitat 
Minimum recorded depth is 20 m. Maximum recorded depth is 97 m.

References

 Alf A. & Kreipl K. (2003). A Conchological Iconography: The Family Turbinidae, Subfamily Turbininae, Genus Turbo. Conchbooks, Hackenheim Germany.

External links
 

heisei
Gastropods described in 1999